Perianne Jones (born 18 February 1985 in Almonte, Canada) is a Canadian cross-country skier who between 2002 and 2015.

She competed at the 2010 Winter Olympics in Vancouver in the women's individual sprint classic and 15km pursuit competitions. In the sprint competition on 17 February, she placed 41st with a time of 3:54.27 (16.22 behind first).

At the FIS Nordic World Ski Championships 2009 in Liberec, Jones finished sixth in the team sprint, 48th in the 10 km, and 54th in the individual sprint events.

Her best World Cup finish was third in a team sprint in Milan, Italy in 2012 while her best individual finish was 19th in an individual sprint event in Canada in 2009.

Cross-country skiing results
All results are sourced from the International Ski Federation (FIS).

Olympic Games

World Championships

World Cup

Season standings

Team podiums

 2 podiums – (2 )

References

External links

Perianne Jones at the 2010 Winter Olympics

1985 births
Canadian female cross-country skiers
Cross-country skiers at the 2010 Winter Olympics
Cross-country skiers at the 2014 Winter Olympics
Living people
Olympic cross-country skiers of Canada
People from Almonte, Ontario
21st-century Canadian women